Events from the year 1488 in Ireland.

Incumbent
Lord: Henry VII

Events
 3 August - Thaddeus McCarthy is forcibly deprived of his seat as Bishop of Ross
 Rathbornes Candles is established in Dublin

Births

Deaths

References

 
1480s in Ireland
Ireland
Years of the 15th century in Ireland